Ding Dong is the 1994 breakthrough second album of Joe Nina. Both the album and the title track "Ding Dong" became major hits.

Track listing
Ding Dong	
Amavava Namatseve	
Kwasa Kwasa	
Kuyabanda	
Each One Teach One	
Something's Gone Wrong	
Peace And Love	
Let's Do It Like This	
Good Luck SA	
We Danced	
Ang'lalanga

References

1994 albums